Local elections were held in Sweden on 15 September 1991 to elect county councils and municipal councils. The elections were held alongside general elections.

Results

Municipal elections

Minor parties

References

Local and municipal elections in Sweden
Local
Sweden